Sadki may refer to:
Sadki, Kuyavian-Pomeranian Voivodeship, a village in north-central Poland
Sadki, Subcarpathian Voivodeship, a village in south-east Poland
Sadki, Świętokrzyskie Voivodeship, a village in south-central Poland  
Sadki, Moscow Oblast, a village in Moscow Oblast, Russia
Sadki, Nizhny Novgorod Oblast, a village in Nizhny Novgorod Oblast, Russia
Sadki, name of several other rural localities in Russia